Imeni Beriya may refer to:
 Shahumyan, Yerevan, Armenia
 Zhdanov, Armavir, Armenia